Delko Lesev (born 6 January 1967) is a retired Bulgarian pole vaulter.

His personal best jump was 5.70 metres, achieved in June 1991 in Plovdiv. This ranks him fourth among Bulgarian pole vaulters, behind Spas Bukhalov, Atanas Tarev, Nikolay Nikolov, and joint with Stanimir Penchev and Iliyan Efremov.

Achievements

References

1967 births
Living people
Bulgarian male pole vaulters